Malawi Lomwe, known as Elhomwe, is a dialect of the Lomwe language spoken in southeastern Malawi in parts such as Mulanje and Thyolo.

Background
The Lomwe are one of the four largest ethnic groups living in Malawi and have history of migration across the Mozambique–Malawi border. Many Lomwe moved into Malawi towards the end of the 19th century and got mixed with the Chewa, in the 1930s due to tribal wars in Mozambique. The Elhomwe language spoken in Malawi is to a large extent a Mihavane dialect while in some districts like Thyolo there are traces of Kokholha dialect. Just like all major tribes of Malawi, the Lhomwes are not natives of Malawi but the Akafula also known as the Mwandionelapati or Abathwa, were the original natives of Malawi.

The Malawian government has taken a step in preserving the language by broadcasting news in Elhomwe language on its MBC radio 1. The establishment of the cultural organisation Mulhako Wa Alhomwe by the late President of Malawi, Bingu wa Mutharika, on 25 October 2008, was another milestone. The Mulhako Wa Alhomwe has its headquarters at Chonde in Mulanje District. It was set up to preserve Lhomwe customs, beliefs and language. It has a library and a school of Elhomwe.

Although the Elhomwe dialect spoken in Malawi is not mutually intelligible with other dialects of Lomwe spoken in Mozambique, it shares many characteristics and much vocabulary.

Lomwe (Elhomwe) is a tonal language, with high-toned syllables (H) contrasting with toneless ones. In nouns there is a limited degree of unpredictability in the position of the H tone, particularly in words borrowed from Chichewa. In verbs there is no tonal distinction between one verb-root and another (i.e. no distinction between high and low-toned verbs as in some other Bantu languages), but in the dialect they study (Emihavani) Kisseberth & Mtenje identify a variety of tonal patterns associated with different tenses. For example, the conjoint past continuous has H tone at the beginning of the macrostem (e.g.  "they were twisting ropes"), the negative subjunctive has H tone on the verb final ( "you should not twist"), and so on.

References

Relevant literature
Kapyepye, Mavuto. Lhomwe Proverbs: A collection of 200 African proverbs in the Lhomwe language of Malawi. Privately published, via Amazon.

Bibliography
Boerder, R.B. (1984) Silent Majority: A History of the Lomwe in Malawi. Pretoria: Africa Institute of South Africa.
Kayambazinthu, Edrinnie (1998). "The Language Planning Situation in Malawi". Journal of Multilingual and Multicultural Development, vol. 19, no. 5–6..
Kisseberth, Charles W; Mtenje, Al. (2022). "Melodic High tones in Emihavani". Stellenbosch Papers in Linguistics Plus, Vol. 62(2), 2022, 1-33.
Murray, S.S. (1932) [1910] Handbook of Nyasaland. Zomba: Government Printer.
Rashid, P.R. (1978) "Originally Lomwe, culturally Maravi, and linguistically Yao: The rise of the Mbewe c. 1760–1840". Seminar paper, History Department, Chancellor College, University of Malawi, Zomba.
Soka, L.D. (1953) Mbiri ya a Lomwe (The History of the Lomwe). London: MacMillan.
Vail, L. and White, L. (1989) "Tribalism in the political history of Malawi". In L. Vail (ed.) The Creation of Tribalism in Southern Africa (pp. 151–192). London: James Currey.

 
Bantu languages
Mixed languages
Languages of Malawi
Languages of Mozambique
Makua languages

fr:Lomwe
ja:ロムウェ語